Mervyn John Denton (1920–1980) was an Australian rugby league player who played in the 1930s and 1940s.

Playing career
Denton played  for Canterbury-Bankstown in 1940 and 1945 & Balmain in 1943 as club captain. Denton was a member of the Canterbury-Bankstown team that lost the 1940 Premiership Final to Eastern Suburbs.

He also represented New South Wales on 12 occasions between 1939 and 1943.

He also moved to Young, New South Wales as captain-coach and represented NSW Country Firsts 1941-42 and 1944 while playing there. Young won the 1941 Group 9 Premiership during Denton's engagement.

He died at Villawood, New South Wales on 23 June 1980, aged 60.

References

External links
Merv Denton's rugby statistics

1920 births
1980 deaths
Australian rugby league coaches
Australian rugby league players
Canterbury-Bankstown Bulldogs players
Balmain Tigers players
Rugby league wingers
Rugby league players from Sydney